Shanrong (山戎), or Rong (戎)  were an Old Chinese nomadic people of ancient China.

Origin
Shanrong literally means the Rong of mountain. The Rong were a collection of tribes that lived in Northern China during the Spring and Autumn period, it is considered a branch of Northern Rong, as opposed to the Western Rong (Xirong). Unlike other vassal states of Zhou dynasty, Shanrong did not pay tribute to the King of Zhou and was considered an outsider state by many. Its existence had become a threat to the Central Plain.

679BC, the Duke Huan of Qi summoned other vassal states to a summit in Juan, effectively became the first hegemon of the Spring and Autumn period. Duke Huan intended to solve the conflicts with Shanrong and southern state Chu to gain other states' respect.

664BC, Shanrong army attacked the State of Yan, Yan asked Qi for help, Duke Huan led a coalition army northern bound but the following year Shanrong has retreated.

Coalition forces continued north, defeated Shanrong at Wuzhong Mount (无终山), present-day Pan Mountain, 
Shanrong leader fled to Guzhu. The coalition forces did not stop there and defeated both Guzhu and Shanrong as well as another nomadic state called Lingzhi (令支) before returning.

Other nomadic tribes
Quanrong 
Guifang 
Xianyun 
Chunwei
Xirong
Murong
Tuoba

See also
Xianbei
Xiongnu
Xueyantuo
Khitan
Jurchen people

Ancient peoples of China
Xiongnu